FlyOver is a flying theater attraction. The first FlyOver attraction, FlyOver Canada, opened in 2013 at Canada Place in downtown Vancouver, British Columbia. The ride takes guests on a virtual flight across Canada, utilizing ride equipment that launches up to 61 people at a time into a 19m (62 foot) diameter spherical screen and employs wind, mist, and scents to enhance the experience. It has since opened at the Mall of America in the US, and downtown Reykjavik, Iceland, and in Las Vegas with plans to open a ride in Toronto.

History

FlyOver Canada
FlyOver was conceived by Vancouver entrepreneurs Stephen Geddes and Andrew Strang, who wanted to bring a new tourist attraction to downtown Vancouver. They were inspired by the Soarin' Over California ride located at Disneyland and Epcot.  They wanted to create a ride that would attract a wide demographic and showcase the diversity of Canada.

In 2013, they, along with  financier Aquilini Developments, formed a partnership called Soaring Attractions. The ride is located in an old Imax theatre at Canada Place. Soaring Attractions invested $16 million to develop the ride

On June 29, 2013, the ride opened as FlyOver Canada. The ride takes guests on a virtual flight across Canada, utilizing ride equipment that launches up to 61 people at a time into a 19m (62 foot) diameter spherical screen and employs wind, mist, and scents to enhance the experience. It became the largest new tourist attraction to open in the region at the time.

FlyOver America 
Soaring Attractions then went on to open a similar ride in Bloomington, Minnesota’s Mall of America with the title FlyOver America in 2016. The estimated cost for the second ride was $20 million US. The ride opened on April 19, and includes footage of Minneapolis, Lake Calhoun, Red Wing, Alaska, Hawaii, and Maine. Beginning in June 8, 2017, the FlyOver Canada film was featured as an alternating attraction at FlyOver America. Currently, as of February 10, 2020, a FlyOver Hawaii film has occupied the alternating attraction slot.

FlyOver Iceland 
FlyOver Iceland was opened on September 1, 2019 in Reykjavik’s Grandi Harbour District. FlyOver Iceland was Pursuit’s first FlyOver attraction located outside of North America. FlyOver Iceland provides a similar experience to FlyOver Canada with multi-sensory special effects and a 20-metre spherical screen. FlyOver Iceland showcases the film Legends of Iceland, along with a series of films available at the other locations.

FlyOver in Las Vegas 
On September 1, 2021, the ride opened as FlyOver in Las Vegas. The ride’s film, “The Real Wild West”, uses a moving platform with six degrees of motion as well as wind, mist, and location-specific scents to elevate the experience as the seats are suspended above landmarks across the United States.

Acquisition by Pursuit and Expansion
In December 2016, Soaring Attractions sold FlyOver Canada to the Phoenix based travel and events company, Pursuit, a subsidiary of Viad Corp.

In 2017, Pursuit announced it would be developing a FlyOver ride in downtown Reykjavik, Iceland in cooperation with Esja Attractions. FlyOver Iceland opened in September 2019.

In February 2019, Viad announced plans to develop a FlyOver ride in Las Vegas, which opened on September 1, 2021 with a FlyOver The Real Wild West ride film with the Iceland film being an alternating attraction.
In July 2019, Viad announced plans to develop a FlyOver ride in Toronto.

Awards 
Strang and Geddes were previous winners of the Business in Vancouver Forty under 40 award.

References

External links
 
 In Park Magazine

Tourist attractions in Vancouver
Amusement rides introduced in 2022